Mühltroff is a town and a former municipality in the Vogtlandkreis district, in the Free State of Saxony, Germany. It is situated 10 km southeast of Schleiz, and 16 km northwest of Plauen. With effect from 1 January 2013, it has merged with Pausa under the name of Pausa-Mühltroff.

References 

Former municipalities in Saxony
Towns in Saxony